Mitrella africana is a species of sea snail in the family Columbellidae, the dove snails.

References

africana
Gastropods described in 2005